Emma Trevayne is a British (expatriate American) speculative fiction author.

Novels

Trevayne's debut novel Coda released in May 2013. A young adult cyberpunk novel, the narrative follows Anthem, an eighteen-year-old boy who lives in a world where music is a drug dispensed by the Corp. Anthem plays a two-faced role within the society. He's a conduit — feeding the power grid by hooking and being drained daily — and he's a rebel — playing music in a tucked away spot with home made instruments against the Corps' mandates.
The follow up is set to release in May 2014, and takes up the narrative eight years after Coda, following Anthem's younger sister, Alpha.

In May 2014, Trevayne's middle grade Victorian fantasy novel Flights and Chimes and Mysterious Times  is due to release from Simon & Schuster Books for Young readers. The story centers around a ten-year-old boy named Jack Foster and his adventure through Londinium, "a quite different London."

Trevayne is a co-author of The Cabinet of Curiosities: 36 Tales Brief & Sinister, also due to release in May 2014. Billed as "a collection of eerie, mysterious, intriguing, and very short short stories," the book is a collaboration with fellow children's book authors Stefan Bachmann, Katherine Catmull, and Claire Legrand.

Representation
Trevayne is represented by Brooks Sherman of the Bent Agency.

Bibliography

Coda Series
Coda (2013) USA, Running Press Kids
Chorus (2014) USA Running Press Kids

The Nova Project
Gamescape: Overworld (2016) Greenwillow Books

Other
Flights and Chimes and Mysterious Times (2014) Simon & Schuster
The Accidental Afterlife of Thomas Marsden (2015) Simon & Schuster
The House of Months and Years (2017) Simon & Schuster

Collaborations
With Stefan Bachmann, Katherine Catmull, Claire Legrand, and Alexander Jansson
The Cabinet of Curiosities: 36 Tales Brief and Sinister (2014) Greenwillow Books

References

External links
Official site

Living people
21st-century American novelists
American women novelists
American science fiction writers
Women science fiction and fantasy writers
Steampunk writers
21st-century American women writers
Year of birth missing (living people)